= Jeevanam Self Employment Scheme =

Self-employment scheme for victims of crime

The Jeevanam Self-Employment Scheme is an initiative by the Government of Kerala, implemented through the Department of Social Justice, to support the dependents of crime victims and individuals who have suffered serious injuries due to criminal acts. The scheme aims to provide financial assistance to help these individuals establish self-employment ventures, thereby promoting their economic independence and rehabilitation. This initiative was first piloted in Pathanamthitta district in 2020.

== Beneficiaries ==
The eligible beneficiaries of the Jeevanam scheme receive a one-time financial aid of ₹20,000 to initiate self-employment activities. To be eligible for financial aid under this scheme, the applicant must be either the person who has been seriously injured in a crime or a dependent (spouse or unmarried child) of a crime victim and the annual family income should not exceed ₹1,00,000. The application must have also been submitted within five years of the crime.
